Delany's mouse or Delany's swamp mouse (Delanymys brooksi) is a species of rodent in the family Nesomyidae.  It is the only species in the genus Delanymys and the only extant member of subfamily Delanymyinae, which also contains the fossil genus Stenodontomys. It was previously placed in subfamily Petromyscinae, but it is apparently not closely related to Petromyscus. It is found in Democratic Republic of the Congo, Rwanda, and Uganda. Its natural habitats are subtropical or tropical high-altitude shrubland and swamps. It is threatened by habitat loss.

Classification

In 2013, a robust muroid phylogeny found Delanymys sister to Mystromys + Petromyscus, reviving the affinity of Delanymys to petromyscines, in addition to Mystromys (Mystromyinae). Conventionally, all three genera have been placed in their own subfamily; a scheme that creates redundant, non-informative monogeneric subfamilies with respect to extant taxa.

More broadly, the clade Delanymys belongs to (Delanymys + (Mystromys + Petromyscus)) was sister to Dendromurinae (Steatomys + (Dendromus + Malacothrix)) and Cricetomyinae (Saccostomus + (Beamys + Cricetomys)).

References

Musser, G. G. and M. D. Carleton. 2005. Superfamily Muroidea. pp. 894–1531 in Mammal Species of the World a Taxonomic and Geographic Reference. D. E. Wilson and D. M. Reeder eds. Johns Hopkins University Press, Baltimore.
Schenk, J. J., Rowe, K. C. & Steppan, S. J. 2013. Ecological opportunity and incumbency in the diversification of repeated continental colonizations by muroid rodents. Systematic Biology 62, 837–864.

Nesomyid rodents
Rodents of Africa
Mammals described in 1962
Taxonomy articles created by Polbot